Brandon Bing (born August 8, 1989) is a former American football cornerback. He was signed by the Denver Broncos as an undrafted free agent in 2011. In addition to playing with the Broncos, Bing also played for the Buffalo Bills and the New York Giants. Bing played college football for Rutgers University. He attended Cheltenham High School, where he received a track scholarship, and walked on to the football team.

Early life
This section is currently being developed. Stay Tuned!

Professional Football Career

Bing, coming out of Rutgers University & Cheltenham High School, won his first NFL Super Bowl in 2012, after defeating the New England Patriots. He is featured on whistle no days of. Season 3 episode 6.

References

External links
 

1989 births
Living people
American football cornerbacks
Buffalo Bills players
Denver Broncos players
New York Giants players
People from Cheltenham, Pennsylvania
Players of American football from Pennsylvania
Rutgers Scarlet Knights football players
Sportspeople from Montgomery County, Pennsylvania